The Eye is a 2008 supernatural horror-thriller film directed by David Moreau and Xavier Palud, scripted by Sebastian Gutierrez, and starring Jessica Alba, Parker Posey, Alessandro Nivola, and Rade Šerbedžija. It is a remake of the Pang Brothers' 2002 film of the same name.

Plot

Sydney Wells is a successful classical violinist from Los Angeles who has been blind since she was five years old, caused by an accident with firecrackers. Fifteen years later, after celebrating conductor and pianist Simon McCullough's birthday during rehearsal, Sydney undergoes a cornea transplant, which causes her eyesight to return, a bit blurry at first. As time goes on, Sydney's vision begins to clear; however, she also begins experiencing terrifying visions, mostly of fire and of people dying. She also sees people that are already dead, on one occasion when a girl passes right through her. Sydney attempts to unravel the mystery of the visions, and also to convince others, primarily her visual therapist and fellow violinist, Paul Faulkner, who helps her in her quest. She knows that she is not going insane.

Accompanied by Paul, Sydney travels to Mexico, where the cornea donor Ana Cristina Martinez was originally from. She discovers from Ana's mother that the images of fire and death are the result of an industrial accident that Ana foretold. Ana hanged herself because she was unable to stop the accident. Sydney forgives Ana's spirit, who leaves in peace. As Sydney and Paul begin their journey home, they are caught in a traffic congestion caused by a police chase on the other side of the border. Sydney sees the little girl from her vision in the car next to her. She then realizes that this is what her vision has been all along, to save the people that are about to die from an accident.

Still able to see the death silhouettes, Sydney begins to get everyone off the highway, starting with a bus filled with people. She and Paul convince everyone to leave the bus and the cars by telling them that there is a bomb inside the bus. However, a driver leading the police chase rushes through the border barriers and collides into a tank truck, igniting leaking gasoline in the process. Sydney sees the little girl trapped in the car, her mother lying on the ground in front of it, already being hit by a passenger and losing consciousness. Paul breaks open the window and gets the girl out. Paul and Sydney carry the girl and her mother to safety just before the tank truck causes a chain explosion. Sydney is blinded by flying glass fragments in the process.

After recovering at a hospital, she returns to Los Angeles to continue performing as a blind violinist, though with a more optimistic view of her condition.

Cast

Production
Remake rights to the Pang brothers' original 2002 Hong Kong film, The Eye, were purchased by Cruise/Wagner Productions.

The band Blaqk Audio provided instrumental versions of the songs, "Between Breaths" and "The Love Letter" that were used in trailers and on the official website for the 2008 film. In response to the buzz it created, Jade Puget of the electronic duo suggested a possible public release of all the CexCells songs in instrumental form.

Alba spent much time with the blind soprano Jessica Bachicha to learn about how blind people lived, used the white cane, read Braille, etc.

This American remake follows Naina, a Hindi movie released in 2005, that is also based on the Pang Brothers' film.

Filming
The filming was done primarily in Albuquerque, New Mexico, and the surrounding areas. Sets were created using much of the downtown metro area, Sydney's apartment was built on a sound stage and was also filmed in Albuquerque. Exteriors were shot to look like the Downtown Los Angeles area. The establishing hospital shots – wherein Sydney is supposed to have had her sight-restoring surgery – are of LAC/USC Medical Center in the Boyle Heights district; 3/4 shots looking north- and southeast of the main 18-floor-high central building (the same building used for the television soap-opera General Hospital). Fictionally, the burned-out Chinese restaurant is supposed to be located just three-blocks from where Sydney lives; the exterior scene, in which Sydney is about to get into a taxicab and travel to Mexico, was filmed on 7th Street, just east of Figueroa, in the downtown area. Shots of Dr. Faulkner's office building are of the Forestry building at the University of British Columbia (UBC). Several other scenes, including outdoor shots, were shot in Albuquerque.

Reception

Critical reception
The film received generally negative reviews from critics, many considering it inferior to the original. On the review aggregator website Rotten Tomatoes, the film received an approval rating of 22% based on 78 reviews, with an average rating of 4.3/10. The site's critical consensus reads: "Featuring wooden performances and minimal scares, The Eye is another tedious remake of an Asian horror film". On Metacritic, the film has a weighted average score of 36 out of 100 based on 13 critics, indicating "generally unfavorable reviews".

Jessica Alba's performance was generally criticized as well; Jeannette Catsoulis of The New York Times called it "vapid". Alba was nominated for a Golden Raspberry Award for Worst Actress for the film. However, she won the Choice Movie Actress: Horror/Thriller award at the 2008 Teen Choice Awards for her performance in the film.

Box office
The film opened in second place at the U.S box office with $12.4 million. As of August 10, 2011, the film has a domestic gross of $31,418,697 with a foreign gross of $25,545,945 totaling an international gross of $56,964,642. In the United Kingdom, it grossed $1,398,958 in its opening weekend at #2.

Accolades

Home media
The film was released on DVD (as single- and two-disc editions) and Blu-ray Disc on June 3, 2008. The two-disc DVD and the Blu-ray Disc versions contain four featurettes ("Shadow World: The Paranormal Past", "Becoming Sydney", "Birth of the Shadowman" and "Dissecting a Disaster"), deleted scenes, the theatrical trailer, and a digital copy of the film for use on Windows and Mac computers.

See also
 Body memory
 Kokila, a 1990 Telugu movie with a similar plot

References

External links

 
 
 
 
 
 

2008 films
2008 horror films
2008 psychological thriller films
American horror thriller films
American ghost films
American psychological thriller films
Canadian horror thriller films
Canadian ghost films
Canadian psychological thriller films
Cruise/Wagner Productions films
Horror film remakes
Films set in Mexico
Films shot in New Mexico
Lionsgate films
Paramount Pictures films
Paramount Vantage films
Films scored by Marco Beltrami
Films about organ transplantation
American remakes of Hong Kong films
Films about blind people
American supernatural horror films
Canadian supernatural horror films
2000s supernatural horror films
Vertigo Entertainment films
2000s English-language films
Films directed by David Moreau
2000s American films
2000s Canadian films
English-language Canadian films